Roland Zöffel (born 17 August 1938) is a Swiss former cyclist. He competed in the team time trial at the 1960 Summer Olympics. He also rode in the 1965 Tour de France and the 1963 Giro d'Italia.

Major results

Road
1963
 9th Overall Tour de Luxembourg
1964
 1st Stage 5a Giro di Sardegna
 4th Grand Prix de Belgique
1965
 2nd Züri-Metzgete

Track
1963
 1st  Individual pursuit, National Track Championships
1964
 1st  Individual pursuit, National Track Championships
1966
 3rd Individual pursuit, National Track Championships

References

External links
 

1938 births
Living people
Swiss male cyclists
Olympic cyclists of Switzerland
Cyclists at the 1960 Summer Olympics
Sportspeople from Münster